Brigadier William Charles Vernon Galwey  (1897–1977) was a senior officer in the British Army who served in World War I and World War II.

Biography 

Galwey was born on 18 February 1897, the son of Lieutenant-Colonel Charles Edward Galwey and Anne Louisa Valentine.  He was educated at Bedford Modern School and commissioned in 1914 in the service of the 18th (Royal Irish) Regiment.

During World War I Galwey was awarded the Military Cross in 1917 and bar in 1918.  After World War I he joined the Royal Signals.  He fought in World War II where he gained the rank of Brigadier in the service of the Royal Signals. He was appointed successively; Chief Signals Officer Palestine and Trans-Jordan (1939–41), Director of Military Communications, Syria and Lebanon (1941–43), Chief Signals Officer, British Troops in Egypt (1943–44), Chief Signals Officer, Western Command (1944-5), Chief Signals Officer Central Command (India) (1945-6), Chief Signals Officer, Allied Land Forces, South-East Asia (1946–47) and finally commander of the Training Brigade, Royal Signals (1947–50) after which he retired. He was invested as an Officer of the Order of the British Empire in 1941.

Galwey died in 1977 in Surrey.

References

External links
Generals of World War II

Officers of the Order of the British Empire
Recipients of the Military Cross
1897 births
1977 deaths
People educated at Bedford Modern School
Royal Irish Regiment (1684–1922) officers
Royal Corps of Signals officers
British Army personnel of World War I
British Army brigadiers of World War II